Fintan Patrick McAllister (born 9 February 1987 in Dublin, Republic of Ireland) an Irish cricketer. He is a left-handed batsman and wicket-keeper. He has represented the Ireland national side, Ireland national under-19 cricket team in 2006, and also played for the Irish Under-23 team.

Playing career 

He represented Ireland in the 2005 European Under-19 Championship as well as the 2006 Under-19 Cricket World Cup. Generally speaking, McAllister is an opening batsman. He has since upgraded to the Irish Under-23s team, where he has participated in the 2006 European Under-23 Championship.

He plays cricket domestically for Malahide Cricket Club as well as for Leinster Lightning in Dublin.

Personal life 

He is the older brother of Irish footballer David McAllister who plays for Sheffield United and the Republic of Ireland Under-23 national football team.

References

External links
 

1987 births
Living people
Cricketers from Dublin (city)
Irish cricketers
Leinster Lightning cricketers
Wicket-keepers